Copionodon is a genus of catfishes (order Siluriformes) of the family Trichomycteridae. It includes three species, C. lianae, C. orthiocarinatus, and C. pecten.

Species
There are currently three recognized species in this genus:
 Copionodon lianae Campanario & de Pinna, 2000
 Copionodon orthiocarinatus de Pinna, 1992
 Copionodon pecten de Pinna, 1992

Distribution 
C. orthiocarinatus and C. pecten originate from the Mucujê River, a tributary of Paraguaçu River in Bahia, Brazil. C. lianae originates from the Grisante River, a tributary of the Mucujê River.

Description 
Copionodon species grow to about  SL.

References

Trichomycteridae
Fish of South America
Fauna of Brazil
Catfish genera
Freshwater fish genera
Taxa named by Mário Cesar Cardoso de Pinna